Kulimlim is a 2004 Philippine horror film directed by Maryo J. de los Reyes. Actor Robin Padilla said that the portrayal of his character Jake Cabrera was challenging since he has to portray five personalities: Jake Cabrera, the three ex-convicts and the demon formed by their souls.

Plot
Based on a technicality, the Supreme Court has ordered the release of the three Satanist men convicted of raping Jake Cabrera's wife Hannah (Tanya Garcia) after eight years in prison. Jake decides to render his own brand of justice. However, the souls of the three convicts possess him, causing harm to his family. His family tries to escape from him and find a way to exorcise the demons.

Cast
 Robin Padilla as Jake Cabrera
 Tanya Garcia as Hannah Cabrera
 Ronalissa Cheng as Sol Cabrera
 Joshua Dionisio as Dwight Cabrera
 Ryan Eigenmann as ex-convict
 Jhong Hilario as ex-convict
 Omar of the group Masculados as ex-convict
 Marky Lopez

References

External links 
 
Kulimlim - Movie Review at Flix Unlimited

2004 horror films
2004 films
Philippine horror films
Films directed by Maryo J. de los Reyes